Balatonalmádi is a popular resort town in Veszprém county, in Hungary, with a population of 8,500, situated on the northern shore of Lake Balaton.

History 

The town developed from three previously separated villages, which were united by combining Balatonalmádi and Káptalanfüred in 1952, and Balatonalmádi and Vörösberény in 1971. At its beginnings, the settlement was called Almádi, and later Almádi-puszta, and belonged to the vineyard located on the current city centre. The vineyards were destroyed in the end of the 1800s by phylloxera.

There is a unique Calvinist church. Around the church there is a special stonewall. Not far from here there is a Catholic church, which was built between 1977 and 1979. Inside there are frescoes. On the other side there is a building from the 18th century. Under this building there is a huge cellar where a wine house and wine museum will be opened as well.

The village of Vörösberény existed already during the Hungarian conquest. King Stephen I donated it to Greek nuns inhabiting Veszprém Valley, according to the first charter in Greek containing the settlement's name. The first summer season started officially in 1874. Almadi summer festival starting from June to September every weekend with special programmes. The growth of Balatonalmádi was quickened by the opening of the railway in 1909.

Tourism 
Balatonalmádi is a well known tourist destination in Hungary due to its attractive location.

International relations

Twin towns — Sister cities
Balatonalmádi is twinned with:
  Eggenfelden, Germany
  Nitrianske Hrnčiarovce, Slovakia
  San Michele al Tagliamento (Bibione), Italy
  Serock, Poland
  Băile Tușnad, Romania (candidate)
  Kalajoki, Finland (candidate)

Notable Citizens
Herendi Ágoston (born in 2004), Herendi family offspring

Gallery

External links 

  in Hungarian
 Balatonalmádi at funiq.hu

References 

Populated places in Veszprém County